Dimitar Simeonov Largov (10 September 1936 – 26 November 2020) was a Bulgarian football midfielder who played for Bulgaria in the 1966 FIFA World Cup. He also played for Septemvri Sofia and Slavia Sofia. He also competed in the men's tournament at the 1960 Summer Olympics.

References

External links
FIFA profile

1936 births
2020 deaths
Bulgarian footballers
Bulgaria international footballers
Association football midfielders
PFC Slavia Sofia players
1966 FIFA World Cup players
First Professional Football League (Bulgaria) players
Olympic footballers of Bulgaria
Footballers at the 1960 Summer Olympics